The Bombardier 7.6 is a Canadian sailboat that was designed by Ron Holland as a racer and first built in 1980.

Production
The design was built by Bombardier Limited in Canada between 1980 and 1983, with about 163 boats completed, but it is now out of production.

Design

The Bombardier 7.6 is a recreational keelboat, built predominantly of fibreglass. It has a fractional sloop rig, a raked stem, a slightly reverse transom, a transom-hung rudder controlled by a tiller and a fixed fin keel. It displaces  and carries  of lead ballast.

Several different port configurations were used during production, including a single and double side portlight.

The design has sleeping accommodation for five people, with a double "V"-berth in the bow cabin, an dinette table in the main cabin that converts to a double berth and an aft starboard quarter berth.

The design has a PHRF racing average handicap of 165, with a low of 159 and a high of 171.

Operational history
In 2009 a Bombardier 7.6, named Gizmo, sailed by Marc Doedens and his father, Ric Doedens, won the overall Lake Ontario 300 competition.

In a 2010 review Steve Henkel wrote, "best features: She is quick and agile, and with her Ron Holland pedigree, she is apt to make the average around-the-buoys racer happy, while still serving the typical young sailing family as an overnight cruiser. Worst features: Her iron keel and thin hull may need more than the usual amount of maintenance to keep in first-class condition."

See also
List of sailing boat types

Related development
Bombardier Invitation

Similar sailboats
Beachcomber 25
Bayfield 25
Cal 25
Cal 2-25
C&C 25
Capri 25
Catalina 25
Catalina 250
Com-Pac 25
Dufour 1800
Freedom 25
Hunter 25.5
Jouët 760
Kelt 7.6
Kirby 25
MacGregor 25
Merit 25
Mirage 25
Northern 25
O'Day 25
Redline 25
Sirius 26
Tanzer 25
US Yachts US 25
Watkins 25

References

External links

Keelboats
1980s sailboat type designs
Sailing yachts
Sailboat type designs by Ron Holland
Sailboat types built by Bombardier Limited